Number 111 is a 1938 Hungarian thriller film directed by Steve Sekely and starring Jenő Törzs, Pál Jávor and Mária Lázár. It is a remake of the 1920 film Number 111, directed by Alexander Korda, which was itself an adaptation of a novel by Jenő Heltai.

Plot summary

Cast
 Jenő Törzs - Joe Selfridge 
 Pál Jávor - Baron Sandor Vajk 
 Mária Lázár - Vera Komarowska / Olga Komarowska 
 Marica Gervai - Mabel Arnett 
 Gyula Csortos - Sam Arnett 
 Gábor Rajnay - Baranyai 
 Andor Lendvay - Himself 
 Zoltán Makláry - Selfridge's Aide 
 Ferenc Hoykó - Hotel Alkalmazott

External links
 
 

1938 films
Hungarian thriller films
1930s Hungarian-language films
Films directed by Steve Sekely
Films based on Hungarian novels
Remakes of Hungarian films
Sound film remakes of silent films
1938 thriller films
Hungarian black-and-white films